Thomas Catchpole may refer to:

Thomas Catchpole (fl. 1361-1389), MP for Hereford (UK Parliament constituency)
Thomas Catchpole (fl. 1390), MP for Hereford (UK Parliament constituency)